Pomodoro (Italian for "tomato") may refer to:

 Arnaldo Pomodoro (born 1926), Italian sculptor
 Giò Pomodoro (1930–2002), Arnaldo's brother, another sculptor
 Pappa al pomodoro, an Italian soup dish
 Pasta al pomodoro, an Italian pasta dish
 Pasta Pomodoro (restaurant), American restaurant chain
 Passata di pomodoro, tomato purée
 The Pomodoro Technique, a time management method